Two-Fisted Gentleman is a 1936 American drama film directed by Gordon Wiles and starring James Dunn, June Clayworth and George McKay.

Premise
Mickey rises from obscurity to become a top prizefighter, but in the process alienates girlfriend Ginger and takes up with a scheming blonde, June.

Cast

References

Bibliography
 Frederick V. Romano. The Boxing Filmography: American Features, 1920-2003. McFarland, 2004.

External links
 

1936 films
1930s sports drama films
American sports drama films
Films directed by Gordon Wiles
American boxing films
Columbia Pictures films
American black-and-white films
1936 drama films
1930s English-language films
1930s American films